Kalbreyeriella is a genus of flowering plants belonging to the family Acanthaceae.

Its native range is Costa Rica to Peru and northern Brazil. It is also found in the countries of Colombia, Ecuador and Panamá.

The genus name of Kalbreyeriella is in honour of Guillermo Kalbreyer (1847–1912), a German plant collector who was sent by James Veitch & Sons of Chelsea, London to collect new plants in West Africa and South America.
It was first described and published in Notizbl. Bot. Gart. Berlin-Dahlem Vol.8 on page 143 in 1922.

Known species, according to Kew:

Kalbreyeriella cabrerae 
Kalbreyeriella gigas 
Kalbreyeriella rioquebradasiana 
Kalbreyeriella rostellata

References

Acanthaceae
Acanthaceae genera
Plants described in 1922
Flora of Central America
Flora of Peru
Flora of Brazil